Spaceface is a psychedelic rock band formed in Memphis, Tennessee, in 2011. Members include Jake Ingalls (formerly of The Flaming Lips), Matthew Strong (also a guitar tech for The Flaming Lips), Eric Martin, and "Big Red" Daniel Quinlan.

History

Ingalls, Strong, and Martin moved in together in 2011 and began making music soon after. In 2012, the band was rounded out by additional musical members and Quinlan, who runs the group's light show, built from a "series of on and off switches, which Quinlan runs off the side of the stage." They began touring later that year. In 2014, they released their eponymous EP, Spaceface EP. Working in Ardent Studios in Memphis in 2015 led the band to release another EP, Live at Ardent Studios, that year. They have played at many music festivals across the United States, including Hangout Music Festival and South by Southwest. On April 21, 2017, they released their first full-length album, Sun Kids.

References

External links
 Official Spaceface website

American psychedelic rock music groups
Musical groups established in 2011
Musical groups from Memphis, Tennessee
2011 establishments in Tennessee